Lionel Lacaze (born 24 March 1955) is a French wrestler. He competed at the 1976 Summer Olympics and the 1980 Summer Olympics.

References

1955 births
Living people
French male sport wrestlers
Olympic wrestlers of France
Wrestlers at the 1976 Summer Olympics
Wrestlers at the 1980 Summer Olympics
Place of birth missing (living people)